Ernest "Ern" Wetherell (26 March 1893 – 31 March 1969) was an Australian politician and a member of the New South Wales Legislative Assembly from 1949 until 1965. He was a member of the Labor Party and held numerous ministerial positions between 1953 and 1962.

Early life
Wetherell was born in the gold rush town of Mount Egerton, Victoria and was the son of a miner. His father and an elder brother died in mining accidents by the time he was 14. He was educated to elementary level at catholic schools and initially worked in a gold battery at Ballarat. He arrived in Broken Hill in 1911 and worked as a miner until the Australian General Strike of 1917. He later worked as a journalist and editor on left wing newspapers.

State Parliament
After an unsuccessful attempt to win the seat of Sturt as an independent at the 1922 state election, Wetherell became active within the Labor Party and was elected to the parliament as the member for Cobar at the 1949 by-election caused by the death of the sitting Labor member Mat Davidson. He retained the seat at the next 5 elections and retired at the 1965 election.

Government
Wetherell was a member of the governments of Joseph Cahill, Robert Heffron and Jack Renshaw. He was appointed as Minister for Transport in 1953 and between 1956 and 1960 was the Minister for Conservation. Wetherell was responsible for the dismantling of the extensive Sydney Tramway network in favour of buses.

From 1960 until his retirement he was the Minister for Education. During his tenure he continued Bob Heffron's work on the education reforms known as the Wyndham Scheme were in the final stages of planning which culminated in the Public Education Act of 1961, which included an expansion of secondary education from 5 to 6 years and the replacement of the Leaving Certificate by the Higher School Certificate.

References

 

1893 births
1969 deaths
Members of the New South Wales Legislative Assembly
Australian Labor Party members of the Parliament of New South Wales
20th-century Australian politicians